The 2015–16 Ferencvárosi TC season was the club's 113th season in existence and the 7th consecutive season in the top flight of Hungarian football. In addition to the domestic league, Ferencváros are participating in this season's editions of the Hungarian Cup, the Hungarian Super Cup and the UEFA Europa League.

First team squad

Transfers

Summer

In:

Out:

Source:

Winter

In:

Out:

Source:

Competitions

Overview

Nemzeti Bajnokság I

League table

Results summary

Results by round

Matches

Hungarian Cup

Round of 16

Quarter-finals

Semi-finals

Final

Hungarian Super Cup

UEFA Europa League

First qualifying round

{{Football box collapsible
|round      = Second leg
|date       = 9 July 2015
|time       = 20:30 CEST
|team1      = Ferencváros 
|score      = 4–1
|aggregatescore = 5–2
|report     = Report
|team2      =  Go Ahead Eagles
|goals1     = Gera Böde Busai Haraszti 
|goals2     = Turuc 
|location   = Budapest, Hungary
|stadium    = Groupama Arena
|attendance = 0
|referee    = Bojan Pandžić (Sweden)
|result     = W
|note       = Ferencváros won 5–2 on aggregate.'
}}
Second qualifying round

Statistics
Appearances and goalsLast updated on 8 May 2016.|-
|colspan="14"|Players out to loan:|-
|colspan="14"|Players no longer at the club:|}

Top scorers
Includes all competitive matches. The list is sorted by shirt number when total goals are equal.Last updated on 8 May 2016Hat-tricks

Disciplinary record
Includes all competitive matches. Players with 1 card or more included only.Last updated on 8 May 2016Clean sheetsLast updated on 8 May 2016''

Notes

References

External links
 Official Website
 UEFA
 Fixtures and results

Ferencvárosi TC seasons
Ferencvárosi TC
Ferencvárosi TC